Castlederg railway station served Castlederg in  County Tyrone in Northern Ireland.

The Castlederg and Victoria Bridge Tramway opened the station on 4 July 1884.

It consisted of a station house (extant), goods store, engine house (location of Lyons Bros garage) and Managers house (extant)

The last services operated on 30 January 1933. The staff went on strike on 31 January, and the line never reopened. It closed formally on 17 April 1933.

Routes

References

Disused railway stations in County Tyrone
Railway stations opened in 1884
Railway stations closed in 1933
Railway stations in Northern Ireland opened in the 19th century